The 2019–20 St. Francis Brooklyn Terriers men's basketball team represented St. Francis College during the 2019–20 NCAA Division I men's basketball season. The team's head coach was Glenn Braica, who was in his 10th season as the head men's basketball coach. The Terriers played their home games at the Generoso Pope Athletic Complex in Brooklyn Heights, New York as members of the Northeast Conference. They finished the season 13–18, 7–11 in NEC play to finish in a three-way tie for seventh place. They lost in the quarterfinals of the NEC tournament to Robert Morris.

Previous season

The Terriers finished the 2018–19 season 17–16, 9–9 in NEC play. The Terriers proceeded to lose in the first round of the NEC tournament to Robert Morris in overtime. After the NEC Tournament the Terriers were invited to the 2019 CollegeInsider.com Postseason Tournament. They lost in the first round to Hampton.

Offseason

Departures

Class of 2019 signees

Incoming transfers

Roster

Regular season

Non-conference games

The Terriers finished non-conference play at 6–6. Their most striking statistic was their 5–0 record at home and 1–6 record on the road, their lone road win came against Hartford. Since the start of the 2017–18 season, the Terriers have produced a 27-6 record at home (as of December 23, 2019). Their largest margin of victory was against Division III opponent Medgar Evers, 122–58. Against a Division I opponent the largest margin was 81–61 versus Delaware State. The Terriers largest margin of defeat was 31 points, which occurred twice, first at NC State then at UMass Lowell. The Terriers ended their non-conference portion of the schedule with a three-game win streak.

Conference games

In their first NEC game, the Terriers extended their win streak to 4 games and improved to 6–0 at home against reigning NEC champions, Fairleigh Dickinson. The Terriers proceeded to lose two consecutive games on their western Pennsylvania road trip: they were blown out by Robert Morris, and then lost a close game against Saint Francis (PA) in the final second, 80–81. The Terriers losing streak extended to three games after losing another close game to LIU, 66–69, which was televised on SNY. The loss to LIU also ended the Terriers 6-game home win streak for the season. The Terriers then snapped their 3-game losing streak by defeating the Wagner Seahawks behind exceptional performances by Chauncey Hawkins (20 pts, 3 ast, 4 stl) and Unique McLean (18 pts, 12 reb, 3 ast, 2 stl, 2 blk). The Terriers then traveled to Mount St. Mary's and were stifled by the Mountaineers defense, losing 39–59, a season low in points for the Terriers. The Terriers next hosted then NEC leading Robert Morris and upset the Colonials, 78–57. Five Terriers scored more than ten points, and McLean recorded his fourth double-double of the season. St. Francis Brooklyn leveled their season (10–10) and conference (4–4) records by defeating Saint Francis (PA) 86–79 at home. In the game, Deniz Celen (22 pts) and Chauncey Hawkins (21 pts) led the Terriers in scoring.

In their next 10 games, the Terriers produced a 3-7 record, nonetheless they were in a three-way tie for 6th place. Due to NEC tiebreaker rules, the Terriers had the 8th seed heading into the NEC Tournament. At the end of their conference schedule it was announced that Deniz Celen and Chauncey Hawkins were selected Third Team All-Conference, and Rob Higgins was selected to the All-Rookie Team.

Schedule and results
 
|-
!colspan=12 style="background:#0038A8; border: 2px solid #CE1126;;color:#FFFFFF;"| Non-Conference Regular Season

|-
!colspan=12 style="background:#0038A8; border: 2px solid #CE1126;;color:#FFFFFF;"| Northeast Conference Regular Season

|-
!colspan=12 style="background:#0038A8; border: 2px solid #CE1126;;color:#FFFFFF;"| Northeast Conference tournament

|-

Awards
Deniz Celen
1x NEC Player of the Week
Selected  Northeast Conference Men’s Basketball Third Team All-Conference

Chauncey Hawkins
1x NEC Player of the Week
1x College Sports Madness NEC Player of the Week
Selected Northeast Conference Men’s Basketball Third Team All-Conference
Rob Higgins
1x NEC Rookie of the Week
Selected to the Northeast Conference Men’s Basketball All-Rookie Team

Larry Moreno
1x NEC Rookie of the Week

See also
2019–20 St. Francis Brooklyn Terriers women's basketball team

References

St. Francis Brooklyn Terriers men's basketball seasons
Saint Francis Brooklyn
Saint Francis Brooklyn Terriers men's basketball
Saint Francis Brooklyn Terriers men's basketball